Mohammad Reyshahri, also known as Mohammad Mohammadi-Nik (29 October 1946 – 21 March 2022), was an Iranian politician and cleric who was the first Minister of Intelligence, serving from 1984 to 1989 in the cabinet of Prime Minister Mir-Hossein Mousavi.

Early life and education
Reyshahri was born into a religious family in Rey on 29 October 1946. He was educated in Qom and Najaf in the field of theology. He and his successor at the ministry of intelligence, Ali Fallahian, were alumni of the Haqqani School in Qom.

Family

Career
Reyshahri began to involve himself in political activities in June 1963 during the religious revolts after Khomeini's famous speech in Qom.
In 1967, he fled to Najaf and stayed there for a while. Upon his return to Iran, he was imprisoned. While incarcerated, he met Ali Khamenei, who later became supreme leader of Iran. Until the Iranian Revolution, he was banned from preaching.

From 1984 to 1989, in prime minister Mir Hossein Mousavi's cabinet, Reyshahri served as the inaugural minister of intelligence.  Into his tenure as minister of intelligence falls the case of Mehdi Hashemi. Reyshahri executed Hashemi two days ahead of schedule on 28 September 1987, so that Reyshahri would not need to follow a letter written by Ayatollah Khomeini on 28 September in which he informed Reyshahri that the sentence had been commuted to internal exile.

Reyshahri was appointed chief prosecutor of the Special Court for the Clergy in 1990. He drafted the court's 47-article ordinance, which was subsequently passed in 1990. Before the Majlis elections in 1996, he established the Society for the Defence of the Values of the Islamic Revolution. 

Reyshahri was also an unsuccessful presidential candidate in the election on 23 May 1997, which led to the presidency of Mohammad Khatami. He finished in fourth place among the four candidates approved by the Guardian Council.

He was appointed representative for Hajj affairs to Ali Khamenei. He was the dean of the Dar Al Hadith Scientific Cultural Institute.

Later life
Reyshahri wrote more than 75 books on Islamic teachings, and one of them, entitled The Wisdom of Christ, was translated and published in English in South Africa to mark the New Year in 2022.

Reyshahri died at a hospital in Tehran on 22 March 2022 at the age of 75. At the funeral on 23 March, Ali Khamenei described Reyshahri as "a benevolent person who served the people" and "always a source of blessings".

References

External links

Members of the Expediency Discernment Council (2000)

1946 births
2022 deaths
Iranian Shia clerics
People from Ray, Iran
Ministers of Intelligence of Iran
Iranian prosecutors
Members of the Expediency Discernment Council
Members of the Assembly of Experts
Candidates in the 1997 Iranian presidential election
Association for Defence of Revolution Values politicians